Fairy Meadow may refer to:

Fairy Meadow, New South Wales, a suburb of Wollongong
Fairy Meadow railway station, a railway station there
Fairy Meadows, a scenic location in Gilgit-Baltistan, Pakistan
Bill Putnam hut, an alpine hut in Canada also known as the Fairy Meadow hut